Lorraine Ryan is a camogie player, winner of an All Star award in 2011, a member of the Galway team which contested the 2010 and 2011 All Ireland finals and a member of the Team of the Championship for 2011.

She is a teacher at Coláiste Bhaile Chláir in Claregalway.

Other awards
Senior Gael Linn Cup 2008, All Ireland Minor 2004. county minor title 2004, junior schools All-Ireland title with Presentation College Athenry, Club League, Championship and Connacht titles.

References

External links
 Camogie.ie Official Camogie Association Website

1989 births
Living people
Galway camogie players